The Wound-Dresser is a piece for chamber orchestra and baritone singer by composer John Adams. The piece is an elegiac setting of excerpts from American poet Walt Whitman's poem "The Wound-Dresser" (1865) about his experience as a hospital volunteer during the American Civil War.

It was written for baritone singer Sanford Sylvan, who premiered it on 24 February 1989 in St Paul, Minnesota, with the Saint Paul Chamber Orchestra conducted by the composer. It was subsequently recorded by the same forces for Nonesuch Records. Interpreters who have performed and recorded it since have included Thomas Hampson, Nathan Gunn, Jeremy Huw Williams, and Christopher Maltman.

In 2011, the Oregon Symphony performed and recorded the composition for Music for a Time of War.

References

The John Adams Earbox, Nonesuch Records, NY 1999

External links 
Full text of Walt Whitman's "The Wound-Dresser"
In the BBC Discovering Music: Listening Library

Compositions by John Adams (composer)
Compositions for chamber orchestra
Musical compositions about the American Civil War
Musical settings of poems by Walt Whitman
1989 compositions